Goodenia pulchella is a species of flowering plant in the family Goodeniaceae and is endemic to the south-west of Western Australia. It is an erect to ascending herb with lance-shaped leaves mostly at the base of the plant, and racemes of yellow flowers.

Description
Flowering occurs from September to January and the fruit is a more or less spherical capsule  in diameter.

Taxonomy and naming
Goodenia pulchella was first formally described in 1837 by George Bentham in Enumeratio plantarum quas in Novae Hollandiae ora austro-occidentali ad fluvium Cygnorum et in sinu Regis Georgii collegit Carolus Liber Baro de Hügel from specimens collected near the Swan River by Charles von Hügel. The specific epithet (pulchella) means "beautiful and small".

Distribution and habitat
This goodenia grows in seasonally wet sites between Kalbarri and the Great Australian Bight in the south and south-west of Western Australia.

Conservation status
Goodenia pulchella is classified as "not threatened" by the Government of Western Australia Department of Parks and Wildlife.

References

pulchella
Eudicots of Western Australia
Plants described in 1837
Taxa named by George Bentham
Endemic flora of Australia